The protégé system in Morocco in the 19th century allowed people working for foreign consuls and vice-consuls certain privileges and legal protections not available to the rest of the population. At first the status of protégé was available only to Moroccans—Muslims and Jews—but it was extended to Europeans by the 1860s. The protégé system was a parallel to the capitulatory system in the Ottoman Empire.

The Madrid Conference of 1880 was held at the behest of Sultan Hassan I in response to France and Spain's abuse of the protégé system.

See also 
 Comprador
 Capitulation (treaty)
 Concession (contract)

References 

History of Morocco
Foreign relations of Morocco